Boggabri railway station is located on the Mungindi line in New South Wales, Australia. It serves the town of Boggabri, opening on 11 July 1882 when the line was extended from Gunnedah. It served as the terminus of the line until it was extended to Moree on 1 April 1897.

Coal
There are a number of coal mines served by balloon loops in the Boggabri area, although these are beyond the immediate station yard.

Services
Boggabri is served by NSW TrainLink's daily Northern Tablelands Xplorer service operating between Moree and Sydney.

References

Easy Access railway stations in New South Wales
North West Slopes
Railway stations in Australia opened in 1882
Regional railway stations in New South Wales